South Wilts Cricket Club is an English amateur cricket club based in the cathedral city of Salisbury, Wiltshire.

South Wilts is one of Wiltshire's leading cricket clubs, having won the Southern Premier Cricket League five times along with a hat-trick of T20 victories from 2013 to 2015. On Saturdays it runs four senior men's teams along with numerous junior boys', women's and girls' sides on other days of the week.

Home matches are played at the Salisbury and South Wiltshire Sports Club ground, which is in the Bemerton area of Salisbury. The ground currently hosts Wiltshire CCC matches and is also used for county representative fixtures and ECB Finals Days.

About 
South Wilts is one of the South's leading cricket clubs, having won the coveted ECB Southern Premier League five times and its precursor the Southern Cricket League once. On Saturdays, the club runs four Senior Men's teams, playing in the Southern and Hampshire Leagues. South Wilts also run arguably one of the strongest junior sections in the region, with boys' and girls' teams playing during the week, and providing the club with many County Youth, Premier League and Minor County cricketers.

Major honours 

 Southern Cricket League (1969–1999)
Champions – 1990
Runners-Up – 1971, 1999
 Southern Premier Cricket League (2000–)
Champions – 2004, 2012, 2013, 2014, 2015, 2021
Runners-Up – 2005, 2008, 2009
 Southern Cricket League Evening Knockout (1977–2001)
 Champions – 1991
 Runners-Up – 1978
 Southern Premier League Twenty20 (2002–) 
 Champions – 2002, 2006, 2013, 2014, 2015
 Runners-Up – 2018
 Southern Premier League Division Three (Second XI)
Champions – 2015 
 Runners-Up – 2018
 Hampshire Cricket League County One (Second XI)
 Champions = 2006, 2010
 Hampshire Cricket League County Three (Third XI)
 Champions = 2003

Teams  
 First XI – Southern Premier Cricket League
 Second XI – Southern Premier Cricket League Division Two
 Third XI – Hampshire Cricket League Division Two
 Fourth XI – Hampshire Cricket League Division Five North West
 Youth Teams – Wiltshire Youth Cricket League, ECB National Club U13/U15/U19 Championships

First Class cricketers 

 Ryan Burl
 Manzoor Elahi 
 Roger Fouhy 
 Ian Holland
 Alan Kruger
 Jason Laney
 Glenn Maxwell
 Chris Rogers
 Angus Small
 Roger Sillence
 Keith Tomlins
 James Tomlinson
 Rowan Varner

External links 
 

English club cricket teams
Cricket in Wiltshire
Salisbury